Más allá de la angustia (Beyond Anguish), is the third telenovela produced in Mexico by Colgate-Palmolive and directed by Rafael Banquells in 1958 occupying the schedule fees Gutierritos at 6:30 PM with a duration of 30 minutes on Channel 4.

The telenovela had a high level of audience at first, but after going considerably low after a week, analysts determined it was because it occupied the time of a success and convince people not finished with this production.

It was mainly carried out by four actresses who play four women addressing their concerns and their lives as housewives, the protagonists were Dalia Iñiguez, Alicia Montoya, Silvia Suárez and, Silvia Caos.

Cast 
 Dalia Íñiguez
 Alicia Montoya
 Silvia Suárez
 Silvia Caos
 Nicolás Rodríguez
 Raúl Farell
 Francisco Jambrina
 Fanny Schiller
 Magda Guzmán

References

External links 
 Más allá de la angustia in Alma-latina.net

Mexican telenovelas
Televisa telenovelas
Television shows set in Mexico
1958 telenovelas
1958 Mexican television series debuts
1958 Mexican television series endings
Spanish-language telenovelas